"The Only One" is a 2011 track from German band Scooter. It was released on 20 May 2011 and is the second single from their 2011 album, The Big Mash Up. "The Only One" charted in Germany, peaking at position 45 on the German charts.

Track listing
CD single (2-track)
 The Only One [3:32]
 The Only Club [5:02]

Download
 The Only One [3:32]
 The Only One (Extended) [5:15]
 The Only Club [5:02]

Charts

References

External links
 

2011 songs
Scooter (band) songs
Songs written by H.P. Baxxter
Songs written by Rick J. Jordan
Songs written by Jens Thele
Songs written by Michael Simon (DJ)